Serili is an Austronesian language spoken on Marsela Island in South Maluku, Indonesia.

References 

Babar languages
Languages of the Maluku Islands